Tuu was an ambient group from the late 1980s to 1999. Led by Martin Franklin, the band emerged from the post acid house chill out scene of the early 1990s in the UK, blending electronica and the emerging sampling technology with traditional and invented global instrumentation.

Personnel
 Martin Franklin – clay pot drums, bowl gongs, water drums, Tibetan bells, samples, and percussion 
 Richard Clare – flutes and pan pipes
 Mykl O'Dempsey – synthesizers and samples
 Rebecca Lublinski – bansuri and Chinese flutes

Discography
 1993: One Thousand Years – SDV Tontrager, released by Waveform in the U.S.
 1994: An Opening of the Earth – SDV Tontrager. Side project by Martin Franklin collaborating with sound artist Michael Northam
 1995: Invocation – Hic Sunt Leones
 1995: All Our Ancestors – Beyond Records (UK), Waveform (US)
 1996: Maps Without Edges – Beyond Records (UK), City of Tribes Records (US). Side project by Martin Franklin collaborating with Eddy Sayer under the name Stillpoint.
 1997: Mesh – Fathom/Hearts of Space Records
 1998: Terma – Fathom/Hearts of Space Records (Collaboration with Nick Parkin)
 1999: The Frozen Lands – 3-inch compact disc, Amplexus
There are various compilation CD appearances that haven't been listed, notably, Planet Dog's Feed Your Head, Whirl-Y-Waves Vol #2, Excursions in Ambience, and Talvin Singh's Back to Mine.

References

 Martin Franklin, "Tuu" (band history by its leader)

External links
 
 
 Codetrip.net – official site of Martin Franklin (including a Tuu page)

British electronic music groups